The Sait Nagjee All India Football Tournament is one of the most prestigious football Tournaments held in Kozhikode, Kerala, India. The tournament was very popular from the beginning & attracted large crowd since 1952. The tournament played until 1995 regularly though with stoppages a couple of times. In 1995, the tournament was won by JCT Mills. Since 1995, there was a gap of 21 years during which the tournament was not held. Due to various reasons including the predominance gained by cricket, lack of support from the government and the escalation of real estate costs made football less popular.

The tournament was revived again in 2016 with clubs from different parts of the world and Argentina U-23 national team. Brazilian footballer Ronaldinho is the brand ambassador for the tournament. FC Dnipro Reserves won the trophy beating Atlético Paranaense Reserves in the final.

Stadium

All the matches of the tournament are being played in the EMS Stadium which is located in the heart of the Calicut city. The West stand was the largest and could accommodate maximum of 1,00,000 people.

Results
List of winners and runners-ups:

References

External links
 
 http://www.uniindia.com/preparation-on-for-sait-nagjee-football-tourney/sports/news/253179.html
 http://www.emirates247.com/sports/local/nri-toilet-titan-from-kerala-to-revive-golden-era-of-malabar-football-2015-11-11-1.610083
 http://www.afternoondc.in/sports/argentina-spain-u-23-to-be-part-of-sait-nagjee-amarsee-intl-tournament/article_150822
 http://www.cyberparktoday.com/kozhikode-city/sait-nagjee-trophy-football-tournament-2016-kozhikode-latin-american-and-european-teams-and-india-u23/
 List of Winners/Runners-Up of the Sait Nagjee Trophy

 
Football cup competitions in India
Football in Kerala
1952 establishments in India
Recurring sporting events established in 1952